The Northern Karwendel Chain is the northernmost of the four great, largely parallel mountain chains in the Karwendel in the Alps. It is made from very pure Wetterstein limestone, which has its heart in the Karwendel and runs for a total length of c. 18 kilometres from Scharnitz in the northeast via Mittenwald to the Wörner, where it turns sharply east, until it finally ends west of the Johannestal valley. It has 25 main summits with an average height of 2,400 m. The highest peak is the Eastern Karwendelspitze. The boundary between Germany and Austria runs along the crest from the Brunnensteinspitze in the west to the Eastern Karwendelspitze in the east. The northwestern side is Bavarian, the southeastern flank is Tyrolean. The Northern Karwendel Chain should not be confused with the southernmost chain of the Karwendel, the Inn Valley Chain, which is known colloquially as the Nordkette or "North Chain" due to its location north of the city of Innsbruck.

The southwestern part is sharply divided by cirques into side ridges (most clearly in the Dammkar cirque), while the eastern part presents a very consistent rock face. A little to the east of its centre point, the chain is interrupted by a very marked saddle, the Bäralpl, which is about 1 kilometres wide and 500 metres deep, a broad plateau which provides the only easy crossing from the Soiern Group north of the range into the Karwendeltal and to the next mountain chain in the Karwendel, the Hinterautal-Vomper Chain.

Important summits  
The most important summits of the Northern Karwendel Chain, following the course of the chain from west to northeast and east, are the:
 Brunnensteinspitze
 Rotwandlspitze
 Kirchlspitze
 Sulzleklammspitze
 Southern Linderspitze
 Gerberkreuz
 Northern Linderspitze
 Viererspitze
 Western Karwendelspitze
 Western Larchetfleckspitze (Lärchfleckspitze), 
 Eastern Larchetfleckspitze (Lärchfleckspitze)
 Tiefkarspitze
 Schönbergspitze
 Südliche Großkarspitze
 Mittlere Großkarspitze
 Nördliche Großkarspitze
 Wörner
 Hochkarspitze
 Raffelspitze
 Bäralplkopf
 Vordere Schlichtenkarspitze
 Hintere Schlichtenkarspitze
 Vogelkarspitze
 Eastern Karwendelspitze
 Grabenkarspitze
 Lackenkarkopf
 Kuhkopf
 Talelespitze
 Southern Stuhlkopf
 Northern Stuhlkopf

External links 

 Report of the first ascent of the Eastern Karwendelspitze and the Vogelkarspitze on 4 July 1870 by Hermann von Barth (Chapter XIX of the book: Aus den Nördlichen Kalkalpen, Gera 1874, pp. 420 ff.)

Mountain ranges of the Alps
Karwendel
Garmisch-Partenkirchen